Gari Eslamabad (also Romanized as Garī Eslāmābād; also known as Eslāmābād) is a village in Zirtang Rural District, Kunani District, Kuhdasht County, Lorestan Province, Iran. At the 2006 census, its population was 64, in 10 families.

References 

Towns and villages in Kuhdasht County